John Clements Glendinning (1866 – 1949) was a unionist politician in Northern Ireland.

Glendinning was a newspaper proprietor and served in various public posts for the Ulster Unionist Party.  He was elected to the Senate of Northern Ireland in 1922, serving until 1933.  He was re-elected to the Senate the following year, and served until 1946.

References

1866 births
1949 deaths
Members of the Senate of Northern Ireland 1921–1925
Members of the Senate of Northern Ireland 1925–1929
Members of the Senate of Northern Ireland 1929–1933
Members of the Senate of Northern Ireland 1933–1937
Members of the Senate of Northern Ireland 1937–1941
Members of the Senate of Northern Ireland 1941–1945
Members of the Senate of Northern Ireland 1945–1949
Ulster Unionist Party members of the Senate of Northern Ireland